is a former Japanese football player. He played for Japan national team.

Club career
Tochio was born on May 26, 1941. After graduating from high school, he joined Furukawa Electric. In 1965, Furukawa Electric joined new league Japan Soccer League. He retired in 1970. He played 61 games and scored 1 goal in the league.

National team career
On May 28, 1961, he debuted for Japan national team against Malaya. He played 2 games for Japan in 1961.

National team statistics

References

External links
 
 Japan National Football Team Database

1941 births
Living people
Japanese footballers
Japan international footballers
Japan Soccer League players
JEF United Chiba players
Association football defenders